The 1968 Winter Universiade, the V Winter Universiade, took place in Innsbruck, Austria.

Medal table

Alpine skiing
Men: Slalom 
Gold – Milan Pazout (Czechoslovakia) 
Silver – Per Sunde (Norway) 
Bronze – Bill Marolt (United States)

Men: Giant slalom 
Gold – Per Sunde (Norway) 
Silver – Milan Pazout (Czechoslovakia) 
Bronze – Franz Vogler (West Germany)

Men: Downhill 
Gold – Scott Pyles (United States) 
Silver – Günther Scheuerl (West Germany) 
Bronze – Loris Werner (United States)

Men: Combined 
Combined event is the overall standings of all disciplines on the Universiade program. 
Gold – Milan Pazout (Czechoslovakia) 
Silver – Robert Wollek (France) 
Bronze – Scott Pyles (United States)

Women: Slalom 
Gold – Kathy Nagel (United States) 
Silver – Viki Jones (United States) 
Bronze – Christina Ditfurth (Austria)

Women: Giant slalom 
Gold – Kathy Nagel (United States) 
Silver – Viki Jones (United States) 
Bronze – Marisella Chevallard (Italy)

Women: Downhill 
Gold – Heidi Obrecht (Switzerland) 
Silver – Christina Ditfurth (Austria) 
Bronze – Paola Strauss (Italy)

Women: Combined 
Combined event is the overall standings of all disciplines on the Universiade program. 
Gold – Kathy Nagel (United States) 
Silver – Viki Jones (United States) 
Bronze – Christina Ditfurth (Austria)

Nordic skiing
Men: 15 km 
Gold – Jon Hoias (Norway) 
Silver – Yevgeniy Platunov (Soviet Union) 
Bronze – Anatoliy Zakharov (Soviet Union)

Men: 4 x 10 km relay 
Gold – Soviet Union 
Silver – Japan 
Bronze – Finland

Women: 10 km 
Gold – Yanna Yelistratova (Soviet Union) 
Silver – Lyubov Menchikova (Soviet Union) 
Bronze – Lidiya Doronina (Soviet Union)

Women: 3 x 5 km relay 
Gold – Soviet Union 
Silver – Poland 
Bronze – Czechoslovakia

Nordic combined
Small hill ski jumping and 15km cross-country

Men: 
Gold – Hiroshi Itagaki (Japan) 
Silver – Masatoshi Sudo (Japan) 
Bronze – Antonin Kucera (Czechoslovakia)

Ski jumping
Men: Small Hill - K90 
Gold – Hiroshi Itagaki (Japan) 
Silver – Masakatsu Asari (Japan) 
Bronze – Yukio Kasaya (Japan)

Figure skating
Men: 
Gold – Vladimir Kurenbin (Soviet Union) 
Silver – Marian Filc (Soviet Union) 
Bronze – Günter Anderl (Austria)

Women: 
Gold – Kumiko Okawa (Japan) 
Silver – Helli Sengstschmid (Austria) 
Bronze – Kazumi Yamashita (Japan)

Pairs: 
Gold – Bohunka Šrámková / Jan Šrámek (Czechoslovakia) 
Silver – Tatiana Sharanova / Anatoli Evdokimov (Soviet Union) 
Bronze – Lyudmila Suslina / Alexander Tikhomirov (Soviet Union)

Ice dancing: 
Gold – Heidi Mezger / Herbert Rothkappl (Austria) 
Silver – Diana Skotnická / Martin Skotnický (Czechoslovakia) 
Bronze – none

Ice hockey
Men: 
Gold – Soviet Union 
Silver – Czechoslovakia 
Bronze – Canada (University of Toronto Varsity Blues)

Speed skating
Men: 500M 
Gold – Erhard Keller (West Germany) 
Silver – Keiichi Suzuki (Japan) 
Bronze – Takayuki Hida (Japan)

Men: 1500M 
Gold – Aleksandr Zhekulayev (Soviet Union) 
Silver – Valeriy Bayonov (Soviet Union) 
Bronze – Arkadiy Kichenko (Soviet Union) 
Bronze – Pekka Halinen (Finland)

Men: 3000M 
Gold – Aleksandr Zhekulayev (Soviet Union) 
Silver – Pekka Halinen (Finland) 
Bronze – Anatoliy Nokhrin (Soviet Union)

Men: 5000M 
Gold – Aleksandr Zhekulayev (Soviet Union) 
Silver – Anatoliy Nokhrin (Soviet Union) 
Bronze – Yoshiaki Demachi (Japan)

References

1968
U
Winter Universiade
U
Winter multi-sport events in Austria
Sports competitions in Innsbruck
Winter Universiade
1960s in Innsbruck